The Ijangui, or Doctrine of the Two Hindrances, is an in-depth treatise concerning the various theories developed on the doctrine of the two hindrances  of the Yogācāra school of Buddhism, by the Korean scholar-monk Wonhyo. This treatise examines and compares the various explications regarding the two hindrances as found in the major Yogācāra texts, including the Yogācārabhūmi-śāstra, Saṃdhinirmocana-sūtra, Mahāyānābhidharma-samuccaya-vyākhyā, Śrīmālādevī-simhanāda-sūtra and Xianyang lun, along with a wide range of other Mahāyāna texts. For an expanded explanation, see the below link.

See also
Tongbulgyo
Essence-Function
Korean Buddhism

External links 
Muller, A. Charles (2000). "On Wŏnhyo's Ijangui (二障義)." Journal of Korean Buddhist Seminar, Vol. 8, July 2000, p. 322-336.Source:  (accessed: January 7, 2008)
Digital Dictionary of Buddhism (log in with userID "guest"; Search for 二障義)

Mahayana texts
Korean Buddhist texts
Buddhist commentaries
Yogacara